Local elections were held in Calamba, Laguna, on May 13, 2013, within the Philippine general election, for posts of the mayor, vice mayor and ten councillors.

Overview
The incumbent mayor, Joaquin "Jun" Chipeco, Jr., decided to run for the position of representative of the 2nd District of Laguna under the Liberal Party. His son, Justin Marc SB Chipeco, the incumbent Laguna's 2nd district representative ran for mayor of Calamba under Nacionalista Party. His opponent was the former vice-mayor Severino Lajara under PDP-Laban.

Results
The candidates for mayor and vice mayor with the highest number of votes win. They are voted for separately. Therefore, they may be of different parties when elected.

Mayoral and vice mayoral elections

City Council elections
Voters elected ten councilors to comprise the City Council or the Sangguniang Panlungsod. Candidates are voted for separately so winning candidates may come from different political parties. The ten candidates with the highest number of votes win the seats.

 
  
  
  
 
 
 
 
 
 
|-
|bgcolor=black colspan=5|

Protests
Supporters of the mayoral candidate Severino Lajara stormed city hall to protest against the suspension of the canvassing votes. They believed the results of the elections were being manipulated.

The mayoral race in Calamba was neck and neck between Lajara and Chipeco. Police kept a close watch on the Commission on Elections (Comelec) office in Calamba.

References

External links
 Official website of the Commission on Elections
  Official website of National Movement for Free Elections (NAMFREL)
 Official website of the Parish Pastoral Council for Responsible Voting (PPCRV)

2013 Philippine local elections
Elections in Calamba, Laguna
2013 elections in Calabarzon